James John Toohey Sr. (23 July 1886 – 11 April 1980) was an Australian rules footballer who played in Western Australia and with Fitzroy in the Victorian Football League (VFL).

Jim Toohey was born in Footscray, the eldest son of James Toohey and Jane Ralph. When he was eight, the family moved to Western Australia and he commenced his football career in 1904 playing in the Perth "first rate junior" league with Claremont (not the current WAFL club) before joining North Fremantle Football Club at the start of the 1905 WAFL season. After two years with North Fremantle he joined Mines Rovers in the Goldfields Football Association where he established himself as a leading player over four seasons with the club. He returned to North Fremantle in 1911 and played for two years before Fitzroy lured him back to Victoria.

After appearing in the opening two rounds of the 1913 VFL season, Toohey left Fitzroy to coach Stawell. He returned in round seven and was a half forward flanker in Fitzroy's premiership team that year. In 1914 he kicked 38 goals, seven of them against a weak University team in the middle of the season. Toohey's career best tally was the fifth highest in the league that year. He also played in their losing 1917 VFL Grand Final side, as a centre half back.

Toohey enlisted to serve in late 1916, but did not depart Australia until early 1918 and after serving in France returned to Australia in late 1919. He resumed his VFL career with Fitzroy in the 1920 VFL season.

Two of Toohey's sons, Jim Jr. and Jack, were also league footballers at Fitzroy.

References

External links 

1886 births
1980 deaths
Australian rules footballers from Western Australia
Australian Rules footballers: place kick exponents
Fitzroy Football Club players
Fitzroy Football Club Premiership players
North Fremantle Football Club players
Mines Rovers Football Club players
Stawell Football Club players
Australian military personnel of World War I
One-time VFL/AFL Premiership players
People from Footscray, Victoria
Australian rules footballers from Melbourne
Military personnel from Western Australia